The Daguan-class troopship (as designated by NATO) is a class of auxiliary ship in People's Republic of China's People's Liberation Army Navy (PLAN). They are used by the Chinese aircraft carrier programme to support sea trials, and provide berthing and logistical support.

The first entered service in 2011.

Ships of the class

References

2011 ships
Ships built in China
Naval ships of the People's Republic of China
Auxiliary ships of the People's Liberation Army Navy